The 2022–23 UEFA Europa Conference League knockout phase began on 16 February with the knockout round play-offs and will end on 7 June 2023 with the final at the Fortuna Arena in Prague, Czech Republic, to decide the champions of the 2022–23 UEFA Europa Conference League. A total of 24 teams compete in the knockout phase.

Times are CET/CEST, as listed by UEFA (local times, if different, are in parentheses).

Qualified teams
The knockout phase involves 24 teams: the 16 teams which qualified as winners and runners-up of each of the eight groups in the group stage, and the eight third-placed teams from the Europa League group stage.

Europa Conference League group stage winners and runners-up

Europa League group stage third-placed teams

Format
Each tie in the knockout phase, apart from the final, will be played over two legs, with each team playing one leg at home. The team that scores more goals on aggregate over the two legs will advance to the next round. If the aggregate score is level, then 30 minutes of extra time will be played (the away goals rule is not applied). If the score is still level at the end of extra time, the winners will be decided by a penalty shoot-out. In the final, which will be played as a single match, if the score is level at the end of normal time, extra time will be played, followed by a penalty shoot-out if the score is still level.

The mechanism of the draws for each round is as follows:
In the draw for the knockout round play-offs, the eight group runners-up were seeded, and the eight Europa League group third-placed teams were unseeded. The seeded teams were drawn against the unseeded teams, with the seeded teams hosting the second leg. Teams from the same association could not be drawn against each other.
In the draw for the round of 16, the eight group winners were seeded, and the eight winners of the knockout round play-offs were unseeded. Again, the seeded teams were drawn against the unseeded teams, with the seeded teams hosting the second leg. Teams from the same association could not be drawn against each other.
In the draws for the quarter-finals and semi-finals, there will be no seedings, and teams from the same association can be drawn against each other. As the draws for the quarter-finals and semi-finals are held together before the quarter-finals are played, the identity of the quarter-final winners will not be known at the time of the semi-final draw. A draw will also be held to determine which semi-final winner will be designated as the "home" team for the final (for administrative purposes as it will be played at a neutral venue).

Schedule
The schedule is as follows (all draws are held at the UEFA headquarters in Nyon, Switzerland).

Bracket

Knockout round play-offs

The draw for the knockout round play-offs was held on 7 November 2022, 14:00 CET.

Summary

The first legs were played on 16 February, and the second legs were played on 23 February 2023.

|}

Matches

1–1 on aggregate. Gent won 5–3 on penalties.

Basel won 2–1 on aggregate.

Lazio won 1–0 on aggregate.

Lech Poznań won 1–0 on aggregate.

Fiorentina won 7–2 on aggregate.

AEK Larnaca won 1–0 on aggregate.

Sheriff Tiraspol won 3–2 on aggregate.

2–2 on aggregate. Anderlecht won 3–0 on penalties.

Round of 16

The draw for the round of 16 was held on 24 February 2023, 13:00 CET.

Summary

The first legs were played on 7 and 9 March, and the second legs were played on 15 and 16 March 2023.

|}

Matches

West Ham United won 6–0 on aggregate.

Fiorentina won 5–1 on aggregate.

AZ won 4–2 on aggregate.

Lech Poznań won 5–0 on aggregate.

4–4 on aggregate. Basel won 4–1 on penalties.

Nice won 4–1 on aggregate.

Anderlecht won 2–1 on aggregate.

Gent won 5–2 on aggregate.

Quarter-finals

The draw for the quarter-finals was held on 17 March 2023, 14:00 CET.

Summary

The first legs will be played on 13 April, and the second legs will be played on 20 April 2023.

|}
Notes

Matches

Semi-finals

The draw for the semi-finals was held on 17 March 2023, 14:00 CET, after the quarter-final draw.

Summary

The first legs will be played on 11 May, and the second legs will be played on 18 May 2023.

|}

Matches

Final

The final will be played on 7 June 2023 at the Fortuna Arena in Prague. A draw was held on 17 March 2023, after the quarter-final and semi-final draws, to determine the "home" team for administrative purposes.

Notes

References

External links

3
February 2023 sports events in Europe
March 2023 sports events in Europe
April 2023 sports events in Europe
May 2023 sports events in Europe
June 2023 sports events in Europe